Arnapkapfaaluk ("big bad woman") was the sea goddess of the Inuit of Canada's Coronation Gulf area. Although occupying the equivalent position to Sedna within Inuit religion, in that she had control of the animals of the seas, she was noticeably different as can be seen by the English translation of her name.

Arnapkapfaaluk was not the beneficent goddess that Sedna was.  Instead, she inspired fear in hunters. Rather than providing the Copper Inuit with the seals and other marine mammals, she would withhold them. The breaking of a taboo or other indiscretion would result in an unsuccessful hunt.

See also
 Arnakuagsak (Greenland)
 Nerrivik (Alaska)

References
 Richard G. Condon, Julia Ogina and the Holman Elders, The Northern Copper Inuit

Inuit goddesses
Inuit mythology
Sea and river goddesses
Hunting goddesses
Animal goddesses